George Coats, 1st Baron Glentanar (11 February 1849 – 26 November 1918), was a Scottish cotton manufacturer.

Background
Coats was the son of Thomas Coats and Margaret Glen, daughter of Thomas Glen, of Thornhill Johnstone, Renfrewshire. He was the younger brother of Sir Thomas Glen-Coats, 1st Baronet, and a first cousin of Sir James Coats, 1st Baronet.

Business career
Coats was the owner of a cotton firm in Paisley. He acquired the Glen Tanar Estate in Aberdeenshire in 1905. In 1916 he was raised to the peerage as Baron Glentanar, of Glen Tanar in the County of Aberdeen. He owned the Belleisle estate near Aboyne, Aberdeenshire for over 30 years until 1918, when it was sold for £25,000. According to his will written in on 2 April 1919, his total estate net worth had been quoted with at £4,334,224 and twelve shillings.

Family
Lord Glentanar married Margaret Lothian Black, daughter of James Tait Black, of Underscar, Keswick, Cumberland. They had one son and two daughters. The elder daughter, the Honourable Lilian Maud, married the 5th Duke of Wellington, while the younger daughter, the Honourable Charlotte Margaret, married as her first husband William Walrond. He died in November 1918, aged 69, and was succeeded in the barony by his only son, Thomas. Lady Glentanar died in July 1935.
A monument to his memory was erected in 1919 in St Thomas's Episcopal Church in Aboyne designed by Sir Robert Lorimer.

References

External links

1849 births
1918 deaths
Barons in the Peerage of the United Kingdom
Barons created by George V